Jessica Chapnik Kahn is an Argentine Australian singer-songwriter, actress and writer. Her solo music is released under the moniker Appleonia. She is also known for her role as Sam Tolhurst/Holden in the Australian television drama Home and Away (2006–08).

Early life 
Chapnik Kahn was born in Buenos Aires, Argentina, but immigrated to Sydney, Australia with her family when she was five years old. On arriving to Australia, speaking no English, they lived in an immigrant hostel for one year. She has a Jewish father of Polish descent and a Catholic Italian mother, and was brought up in an Argentine Spanish-speaking home (she is fluent in Spanish). Both religions were a strong influence in her life. After high school, Chapnik Kahn attended the University of New South Wales in Sydney and graduated with a degree in sociology, theatre and film.

Career

Music career 
Chapnik Kahn formed her first band at the age of 17. After one year, the band dismantled and she toured nationally and internationally playing keyboards and singing in the bands of artists and bands such as Sarah Blasko, Old Man River, Lior and the Kahn Brothers. While touring, Chapnik Kahn met musician Ben Lee and the two later began collaborating on music projects.

In 2008 Chapnik Kahn recorded the soundtrack for the Australian film The Square, directed by Nash Edgerton. All songs were written and produced by Ben Lee, and sung by Chapnik Kahn. The album was nominated for both an AFI Award and an Australian Recording Industry Association (ARIA) Fine Arts Award for "Best Original Soundtrack".

Following this album, Chapnik Kahn re-invented her solo persona as Appleonia, a character inspired by mythology and Prince’s film Purple Rain.

In 2013, Chapnik Kahn teamed with musician Nadav Kahn and scored the film Despite the Gods, a documentary directed by Penny Vozniak which closely follows the journey of director Jennifer Chambers Lynch as she makes her film Hisss in India. The soundtrack was released in 2013 and features the song 'She is the Sun' which Chapnik Kahn sang with Craig Nicholls from The Vines.

Chapnik Kahn again collaborated with Ben Lee, co-writing and co-producing his album Ayahuasca: Welcome to the Work, released in April 2013. The album is a sonic documentation of her and Lee's experiences with the South American healing medicine, Ayahuasca.

In 2014 she released her album 'OH', which was recorded over a few continents and over several years. It features the handiwork of several collaborators including Dntel, Ian Ball and Nadav Kahn.

Acting career 
Chapnik Kahn trained as an actress in New York City for two years at the Atlantic Theater Company Acting School, which was founded by playwright David Mamet. While living in New York, she acted in a string of plays, and on returning to Sydney she continued working in theatre.  In 2006 she joined Australian TV drama Home and Away, playing Sam Tolhurst/Holden. The role was originally a three-month contract, but was extended to almost two years due to the storyline’s popularity. Chapnik Kahn later had a guest role in the American adventure/fantasy series Legend of the Seeker, playing Anna Brighton. The episodes (episode 12: "Home" and episode 14: "Hartland") were broadcast in early 2009 on Disney-ABC Domestic Television. In 2009 she also starred in the Spanish-speaking short film Amanecer (Daybreak), directed by Alvaro D. Ruiz, a film that won several awards in Latin film festivals worldwide.

Writing career 
Chapnik Kahn published her first children's book in 2018 called Lenny and the Ants. It was illustrated by Australian artist Matthew Martin. In 2019, she released a collection of poems and drawings called MADRE, inspired by the birth of her son, Lev. The book was published by Mother Courage.

Jessica has directed and co-directed music videos for her Appleonia albums. In 2013 she directed a music video for Ben Lee for his song 'On My Knees'.

Personal life 
In 2011 Chapnik Kahn married musician Nadav Kahn, formerly of art rock band Gelbison. They have a son, Lev Vishnu.

Awards and nominations

ARIA Music Awards
The ARIA Music Awards is an annual awards ceremony that recognises excellence, innovation, and achievement across all genres of Australian music. They commenced in 1987. 

! 
|-
| ARIA Music Awards of 2008
| The Square (with Ben Lee)
| Best Original Soundtrack, Cast or Show Album
| 
| 
|-

References

External links
 appleoniamusic
 

Argentine people of Italian descent
Argentine people of Polish-Jewish descent
Argentine emigrants to Australia
Australian people of Italian descent
Australian people of Polish-Jewish descent
Australian soap opera actresses
Actresses from Buenos Aires
Actresses from Sydney
Australian women singers
Living people
Year of birth missing (living people)